John Kizell was an American immigrant to Sierra Leone, who became a leader in Sierra Leone as it was being developed as a new British colony in the early nineteenth century. Believed born on Sherbro Island, he was captured and enslaved as a child, and shipped to Charleston, South Carolina, where he was sold again. Years later, after the American Revolutionary War, during which he gained freedom with the British and was evacuated to Nova Scotia, he eventually returned to West Africa. In 1792 he was among 50 native-born Africans among the 1200 mostly African-American Black Loyalists who were resettled in Freetown.

A Baptist, Kizell belonged to the congregation of African American David George (Baptist). After reaching Freetown, Kizell soon returned to his native Sherbro Island, which was just across the Sherbro River estuary from the mainland.

Kizell had learned English in South Carolina, and he soon served as an intermediary between the British colonial government and the Sherbro on the island. The people were also predominant in the nearby mainland region.

From about 1818 to 1820, Kizell worked with agents of the American Colonization Society, who had their own resettlement plan for free blacks from the United States. He worked with Samuel Bacon and Samuel Crozer, and with new African-American settlers, to help colonize the territory that would later become the Republic of Liberia.

Early life and slavery
John Kizell was long believed by historians to be Sherbro, born to a chief on what was later called Sherbro Island, in what is now Bonthe District, Southern Province, Sierra Leone. Kevin Lowther has proposed that Kizell may have been Bom or Krim, other peoples who lived on the islands and in this area near the Sierra Leone coast. As a child, Kizell (as named in North America) was captured and sold into slavery, taken during a visit to see his uncle, a chief who lived nearby.

Slavery
Surviving the Middle Passage, the boy was sold again after his ship reached Charleston, South Carolina, which had a major slave market. He was named John. The city was the center of a major area of cultivation of rice and long-staple cotton, two commodity crops that were labor-intensive and created a high demand for enslaved labor.

In 1779 during the American Revolutionary War, John learned of the Philipsburg Proclamation by British General Henry Clinton, who offered freedom to slaves of rebels who escaped to British lines. He had taken the surname Kizell and escaped during the Siege of Charleston, when the British and allies surrounded the city. He joined the British.

Return to Africa
After the war, the British kept their promise of freedom. Kizell was among nearly 3,000 Black Loyalists who were evacuated and resettled in Nova Scotia, along with white Loyalists. The Crown had promised them land in the new colony. Implementation of such plans was slow, and the immigrants suffered from the harsh climate, limited supplies and, for the blacks, discrimination by present and former slaveholders.

A short time passed before they were offered another choice. The British were developing a new colony in West Africa for resettling the freed slaves they had evacuated, including some Black Poor from London. Most were former enslaved African Americans from the United States. The British offered the Black Loyalists a chance for their own colony.

Along with 1,200 African-American Black Loyalists, Kizell joined the expedition to Freetown on the coast. The Sierra Leone Company was a quasi-business that managed the development of the new settlement. Kizell helped establish Settler Town, Sierra Leone, the first area developed as part of what is now Freetown.

Kizelltown
Kizell ran a trading post on his native Sherbro land, a kind of outpost colony of Freetown. It was called Kizzelltown. He also served as an intermediary between British officials and inhabitants of Sherbro Island. They included Afro-Europeans such as the Caulkers and Clevelands, who were descendants of early white British slave traders and Sherbro women. Kizell became a prosperous trader and a Baptist preacher who established a church on Sherbro Island.

Dealings with the ACS
In 1820 the American Colonization Society (ACS) was established. It intended to resettle free blacks from the United States to a new American colony in West Africa.

In 1818 Kizell had met their representatives Samuel J. Mills and Ebenezer Burgess, who visited to conduct a survey of potential sites and to report to the ACS about African colonization. Kizell also met Paul Cuffe, a wealthy black American shipbuilder who launched an independent effort to resettle free blacks in this area. Kizell told him that the Sherbro lands would be suitable for African-American settlers.

In 1820, Kizell helped ACS officials Samuel Bacon and Samuel Crozer, as well as African-American settlers such as Daniel Coker, negotiate with local leaders on the island for land.

Debt
Kizell maintained ties with the African-American community in Settler Town, Sierra Leone and owned 278 lots in the city. For unclear reasons, Kizell fell into debt and forfeited his property until he was able to repay the Sierra Leone Company.

References

Bibliography

Clifford, Mary Louise, From Slavery to Freetown: Black Loyalists After the American Revolution, McFarland, 2006, 
Ciment, James (2013). Another America: The Story of Liberia and the Former Slavers Who Ruled It. New York: Hill and Wang.
Clegg, Claude A. (2004). The Price of Liberty: African Americans and the Making of Liberia. Chapel Hill: UNC Press

Year of birth missing
Year of death missing
African Christians
Baptists from the United States
Nova Scotian Settlers
Sherbro people
18th-century American slaves
American former slaves